Dongchang may refer to:

Eastern Depot, a Ming dynasty secret police agency
Dongchang District, a district in Tonghua, Jilin, China
Dongchang Subdistrict, a subdistrict in Dongchang District
Dongchang, Sichuan (董场), a town in Dayi County, Sichuan, China
Dongchang, Guangxi (东昌), a town in Lipu County, Guangxi, China

See also
Dongchangfu District, a district in Liaocheng, Shandong, China
Dong Chang (warlord) (died 896), warlord and self-proclaimed emperor during the late Tang dynasty
Dongcheng District (disambiguation)
Tongchang County, a county in North P'yŏngan province, North Korea